The Virsligas Winter Cup was a league cup in Latvian football. It started in 2013 and ended after the 2018 competition.

List of finals
The results of the finals:

Total titles won

References

External links

 
Latvia
1
Recurring sporting events established in 2013
2013 establishments in Latvia